Cornelius Clark White (May 2, 1870 - April 7, 1940) was an American politician from Scott County, Missouri, who served as mayor of Sikeston and in the Missouri House of Representatives.  He worked as a druggist in the Missouri cities of Bertrand, Belmont, Cardwell, New Madrid, and Sikeston.  White died in 1940 and was pronounced dead by Dr. G. W. H. Presnell, mayor of Sikeston.

References

External links

1870 births
Mayors of places in Missouri
Democratic Party members of the Missouri House of Representatives
People from Sikeston, Missouri
1940 deaths